Mateusz Szczepaniak may refer to:

 Mateusz Szczepaniak (footballer) (born 1991), Polish footballer
 Mateusz Szczepaniak (speedway rider) (born 1987), Polish speedway rider